The Vimśatikāvijñaptimātratāsiddhi or Twenty Verses on Consciousness Only is an important work in Buddhism. The work was composed by Vasubandhu  (fl. 4th century) and is notable within the discourse of Yogacara and has influenced subsequent Buddhadharma discourse of other schools.

Anacker (1984: p. 159) in making reference to the works of Dharmapala and Xuanzang, holds that:

Dan Lusthaus (undated: unpaginated) holds that:

Tola and Dragonetti (2004, p. 134), in contrast, assert that:

They base their claim on their translation from Vasubandhu's autocommentary to the Twenty Verses, which opens with the statement

Notes

Mahayana texts
Yogacara
Yogacara shastras